The Chi-Town Shooters were a professional ice hockey team that played in the All American Hockey League. The team played its home games at the Midwest Training & Ice Center in Dyer, Indiana. The "Shooters" name refers to the casinos in the South Shore region of northwestern Indiana.

History
On April 5, 2009, the Shooters won their first and only Rod Davidson Cup, beating the Battle Creek Revolution in the final deciding game of a best-of-five series.

The team did not return to the AAHL looking to focus on launching a junior ice hockey team instead.. However, the West Michigan Blizzard relocated to the arena as the Indiana Blizzard before the 2010–11 season. By December 2010, the Blizzard had folded and the roster was taken over by the Shooters' organization and name for the remainder of the season. By the end of the season, the only other team remaining was the Battle Creek Revolution and the league folded after the season.

Season-by-season results

References

All American Hockey League (2008–2011) teams
Lake County, Indiana
Ice hockey teams in Indiana
Chi-Town
2008 establishments in Indiana
Ice hockey clubs established in 2008
2011 disestablishments in Indiana
Ice hockey clubs disestablished in 2011